Bohumil Prošek (26 March 1931 – 30 August 2014) was a Czech ice hockey player who competed in the 1956 Winter Olympics. He was born in Kladno, Czechoslovakia.

References

1931 births
2014 deaths
Czech ice hockey left wingers
Ice hockey players at the 1956 Winter Olympics
Olympic ice hockey players of Czechoslovakia
Sportspeople from Kladno
HC Kometa Brno players
Rytíři Kladno players
HC Slavia Praha players
Czechoslovak ice hockey left wingers
Czechoslovak ice hockey coaches
Czech ice hockey coaches